The William Thomas Abington House is a historic house located on Center Street in Beebe, Arkansas, midway between East Mississippi Street and Birch Street.

Description and history 
It is a roughly square two-story timber-framed structure, with a hip roof of original metal, and a two-story porch extending across its front facade. Although it is typical of houses built in Beebe in the 1880s, it is one of only a few of the type to survive. It was designed by the first owner, William Thomas Abington, who moved to Beebe with his family in the late 1870s. Abington's son, W. H. Abington, was a prominent local doctor and politician; the Abington Library at Arkansas State University Beebe is named for him.

The house was listed on the National Register of Historic Places on July 11, 1992.

See also
National Register of Historic Places listings in White County, Arkansas

References

Houses on the National Register of Historic Places in Arkansas
Houses completed in 1880
Houses in White County, Arkansas
National Register of Historic Places in White County, Arkansas
Buildings and structures in Beebe, Arkansas
Central-passage houses
1880 establishments in Arkansas